The 1992 IBF World Junior Championships was an international badminton tournament held at Istora Senayan in Jakarta, Indonesia from 8 to 14 November 1992.

Medalists

Individual competition

Finals

Semifinals

References

External links 
 World Junior Championships at Badminton.de
 tangkis.tripod.com

BWF World Junior Championships
World Junior Championships, 1992
Badminton tournaments in Indonesia
1992 in Indonesian sport
International sports competitions hosted by Indonesia